Oscar Johan Ingvar Enestad (born  21 February 1997) is a Swedish singer. He was a member of the boyband FO&O between 2013 and 2017. He participated in Melodifestivalen 2017 broadcast on SVT along with the band, making it to the final with the song "Gotta Thing About You". In 2017, the band revealed that they were about to disband. Enestad launched his solo career in 2018, by revealing that he would participate in Melodifestivalen 2019 with the song "I Love It".

Discography

Albums with FO&O

Singles as The Fooo, The Foo Conspiracy and FO&O

Singles (solo)

As featured artist

References

External links

Living people
1997 births
Swedish male singers
Singers from Stockholm
Melodifestivalen contestants of 2019
Melodifestivalen contestants of 2017